The 1903 Hong Kong Sanitary Board election was held on 25 March 1903 was the second election for the two unofficial seats in the Sanitary Board of Hong Kong under the reconstituted Public Health and Building Ordinance of 1903.

Only ratepayers who were included in the Special and Common Jury Lists of the years or ratepayers who are exempted from serving on Juries on account of their professional avocations were entitled to vote at the election.

Candidates

Outcome
Henry Edward Pollock, the former Acting Attorney General and the member of the Executive and Legislative Council was elected.

References
 Endacott, G. B. Government and people in Hong Kong, 1841-1962 : a constitutional history Hong Kong University Press. (1964) 
 The Hong Kong Government Gazette

1903 elections in Asia
1903 in Hong Kong
Sanitary
March 1903 events